Arthisma is a genus of moths of the family Noctuidae.

Species
 Arthisma pectinata Wileman & West, 1929
 Arthisma rectilinea Roepke, 1948
 Arthisma scissuralis Moore, 1883

References
 Arthisma at Markku Savela's Lepidoptera and Some Other Life Forms
 Natural History Museum Lepidoptera genus database

Catocalinae
Moth genera